The Pensaukee River is a river located in northeastern Wisconsin. It is a tributary of Lake Michigan via Green Bay.

Route
Its southern branch rises from Pautz Lake in Shawano County and northern branch originates in Pensaukee Lakes in Shawano County. It passes near the communities of Krakow, Klondike, Abrams, and its mouth empties into Green Bay near Pensaukee.

Drainage basin
Its drainage basin covers Oconto County and Shawano County, Wisconsin.

References

Tributaries of Lake Michigan
Rivers of Wisconsin
Rivers of Oconto County, Wisconsin
Rivers of Shawano County, Wisconsin